Traditional Chinese Studies Institute is a 2001 oil painting by Chinese painter Chen Danqing. It portrays five masters of Chinese language and literature who taught at Tsinghua University, Zhao Yuanren, Liang Qichao, Wang Guowei, Chen Yinque and Wu Mi.

From 2000 to 2004, Chen was the professor at the Academy of Arts & Design, Tsinghua University. He created this painting in 2001 to celebrate the 90th anniversary of Tsinghua University's founding.

This painting was sold in 2007 in an auction in Beijing by Beijing Poly International Auction Co. for RMB¥13.44 million. In 2012, it was sold again for RMB¥20.7 million in an auction by China Guardian Auctions Co.

References

2001 paintings
Chinese paintings